Leptotyphlops telloi, also known commonly as Tello's threadsnake or Tello's worm snake, is a species of snake in the family Leptotyphlopidae. The species is indigenous to southern Africa.

Etymology
The specific name, telloi, is in honor of Mozambican herpetologist José Luis Pessoa Lobão Tello.

Geographic range
L. telloi is native to Mozambique and adjacent Eswatini.

Description
A small species, L. telloi may grow to a maximum snout-vent length (SVL) of only . It is solid black, except for white patches on the head.

Habitat
The preferred habitat of L. telloi is thornveld.

Reproduction
L. telloi is oviparous.

References

Further reading
Broadley DG, Watson G (1976). "A Revision of the Worm Snakes of South-eastern Africa (Serpentes: Leptotyphlopidae)". Occasional Papers of the National Museums and Monuments of Rhodesia, Series B, Natural Sciences, Bulawayo 8: 465–510. (Leptotyphlops telloi, new species, p. 500).

Leptotyphlops
Reptiles described in 1976